The Marsh Chapel Experiment, also called the "Good Friday Experiment", was an experiment conducted on Good Friday, April 20, 1962 at Boston University's Marsh Chapel. Walter N. Pahnke, a graduate student in theology at Harvard Divinity School, designed the experiment under the supervision of Timothy Leary, Richard Alpert, and the Harvard Psilocybin Project. Pahnke's experiment investigated whether psilocybin (the active principle in psilocybin mushrooms) would act as a reliable entheogen in religiously predisposed subjects.

Experiment
Prior to the Good Friday service, twenty graduate degree divinity student volunteers from the Boston area were randomly divided into two groups. In a double-blind experiment, half of the students received psilocybin, while a control group received a large dose of niacin. Niacin produces clear physiological changes and thus was used as an active placebo. In at least some cases, those who received the niacin initially believed they had received the psychoactive drug. However, the feeling of face flushing (turning red, feeling hot and tingly) produced by niacin subsided about an hour after receiving the dose, whereas the effects of the psilocybin intensified over the first few hours. 

Almost all of the members of the experimental group reported experiencing profound religious experiences, providing empirical support for the notion that psychedelic drugs can facilitate religious experiences. One of the participants in the experiment was religious scholar Huston Smith, who would become an author of several textbooks on comparative religion. He later described his experience as "the most powerful cosmic homecoming I have ever experienced".  

Another participant was Paul Lee, who was Paul Tillich's teaching assistant at Harvard Divinity School and one of the founding editors of the Psychedelic Review (along with much of the original cast of the Psilocybin Project). Lee was given the niacin, at least for these sessions. Amidst other intriguing journal observations, in the entry titled "The Mushroom" Lee recounted,

Doblin's follow-up
In a 25-year follow-up to the experiment in 1986, all of the subjects given psilocybin except for one described their experience as having elements of "a genuine mystical nature and characterized it as one of the high points of their spiritual life". Psychedelic researcher Rick Doblin considered Pahnke's original study partially flawed due to incorrect implementation of the double-blind procedure, and several imprecise questions in the mystical experience questionnaire.  Pahnke had failed to mention that several subjects had struggled with acute anxiety during their experience. One had to be restrained and injected with Thorazine after he had fled the chapel convinced he was chosen to announce the return of the Messiah. Nevertheless, Doblin said that Pahnke's study cast "a considerable doubt on the assertion that mystical experiences catalyzed by drugs are in any way inferior to non-drug mystical experiences in both their immediate content and long-term effects". A similar sentiment was expressed by clinical psychologist William A. Richards, who in 2007 stated "[psychedelic] mushroom use may constitute one technology for evoking revelatory experiences that are similar, if not identical, to those that occur through so-called spontaneous alterations of brain chemistry."

Griffiths' study
In 2002 (published in 2006), a study was conducted at Johns Hopkins University by Roland R. Griffiths that assessed mystical experience after psilocybin. In a 14-month follow-up to this study, over half of the participants rated the experience among the top five most meaningful spiritual experiences in their lives, and considered the experience to have increased their personal well-being and life satisfaction.

See also
Concord Prison Experiment

Notes

References
Roberts, T. B. (editor) (2001). Psychoactive Sacramentals: Essays on Entheogens and Religion. San Francosco: Council on Spiritual Practices. 
Roberts, T. B., and Hruby, P. J. (1995-2002). Religion and Psychoactive Sacraments An Entheogen Chrestomathy. Online archive. 
Roberts, T. B. "Chemical Input—Religious Output: Entheogens." Chapter 10 in Where God and Science Meet: Vol. 3: The Psychology of Religious Experience Robert McNamara (editor)(2006). Westport, CT: Praeger/Greenwood.

External links

Video describing the immediate and long term effects of the Marsh Chapel Experiment on Reverend Randall Laakko

Media reports of 2006 Johns Hopkins Research 

Psychedelic drug research
Psychology experiments
Neurotheology
History of Harvard University
1962 in Massachusetts
1960s in Boston
April 1962 events in the United States
Timothy Leary
Ram Dass